= Lane Allen Baker =

American chemistry professor

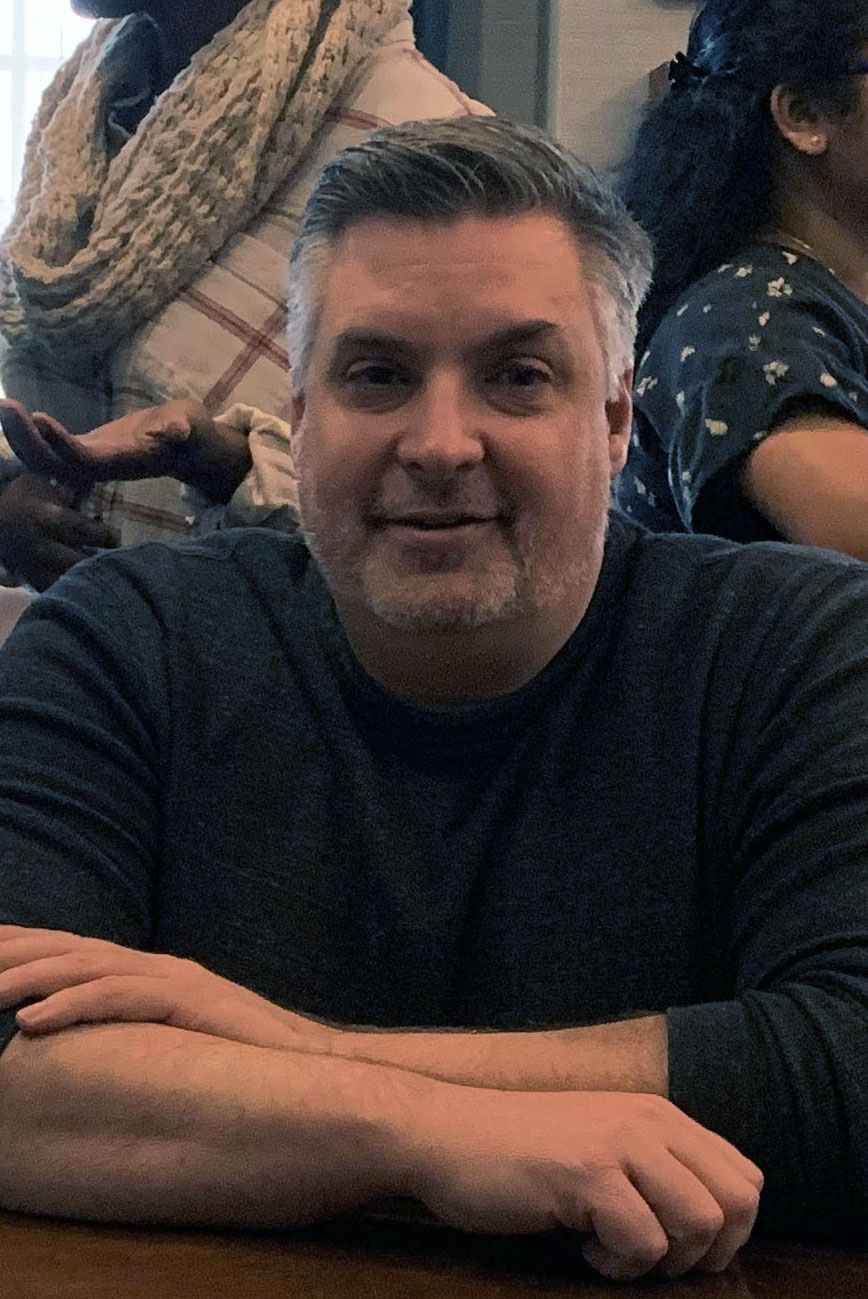
- American Electrochemist
- Born: 1971 AD
- Occupation: Professor of Chemistry
- Employer(s): Texas A&M University
- Website: https://bakergrp.org

Lane Allen Baker is an American electrochemist who is presently the Carl D. McAfee '90 Chair of Analytical Chemistry in the Department of Chemistry at Texas A&M University.

== Biography ==
Lane Baker studied Chemistry as an undergraduate at Missouri State University, Springfield, MO and as a graduate student at Texas A&M University. Baker has served as Chair for the Division of Analytical Chemistry of the American Chemical Society and as president and a board member for the Society for Electroanalytical Chemistry (SEAC).

== Honours, decorations, awards and distinctions ==
- 2024 Head, Department of Chemistry, Texas A&M University, Texas A&M University
- 2023 Spiers Memorial Lecture, Faraday Discussions
- 2023 Charles N. Reilley Award, Society for Electroanalytical Chemistry
- 2022 Fellow, American Association for the Advancement of Science
- 2021 Analytical Scientist Power List
- 2021 Fellow, American Chemical Society
- 2021 Award in Electrochemistry, Division of Analytical Chemistry, American Chemical Society
